Bácskai Újság (lit. Bachkan News) was a Hungarian language daily newspaper. It was founded in 1899, with the purpose of serving as the information source for the Magyars and Hungarian language-speaking population in Bács-Bodrog County within the Kingdom of Hungary in Austria-Hungary. It was published in Subotica (Today in Serbia). Bácskai Újság was disestablished in 1900.

See also
 Bácskai Friss Újság
 Bácskai Újság (1935)
 Hungarians in Vojvodina

References

External links
 (Hungarian) Kosztolányi Dezső emlékoldal - Bácskai lapok.1 Sajtótörténeti háttér a Forrásjegyzék 2. kötetéhez
 (Hungarian) Születésnapi Újság, születésnapi újságok, régi újság minta ajándék ...
 (Hungarian) Szabadka városfejlődése 1700 és 1910 között
 (Hungarian) LÉTÜNK - TÁRSADALOM, TUDOMÁNY, KULTÚRA, 2002.1-2

Defunct newspapers published in Serbia
History of Subotica
Hungarian-language newspapers
Newspapers established in 1899
Publications disestablished in 1900
1899 establishments in Austria-Hungary
1900 disestablishments in Austria-Hungary